The St. Peter's Cathedral Basilica is a Roman Catholic cathedral and basilica dedicated to Saint Peter located in Kumasi, Ghana. The church is the seat of the Archdiocese of Kumasi. The church was dedicated on 2 June 2004.

References

Basilica churches in Ghana
Roman Catholic churches completed in 2004
Roman Catholic cathedrals in Ghana
Churches in Kumasi